The 1987 Family Circle NSW Open was a women's tennis tournament played on outdoor grass courts at the White City Stadium in Sydney, Australia that was part of the Category 3 tier of the 1987 Virginia Slims World Championship Series. It was the 95th edition of the tournament and was held from 5 January until 11 January 1987. Sixth-seeded Zina Garrison won the singles title.

Finals

Singles
 Zina Garrison defeated  Pam Shriver 6–2, 6–4
 It was Garrison's 1st singles title of the year and the 5th of her career.

Doubles
 Betsy Nagelsen /  Elizabeth Smylie defeated  Jenny Byrne /  Janine Tremelling 6–7(5–7), 7–5, 6–1

References

External links
 ITF tournament edition details
 Tournament draws

Family Circle NSW Open
Sydney International
Family Circle NSW Open
Family Circle NSW Open
Family Circle NSW Open, 1984